Lake Lynn is an unincorporated community in Fayette County, Pennsylvania, United States. Lake Lynn had a post office, with ZIP code 15451.

References

Unincorporated communities in Fayette County, Pennsylvania
Unincorporated communities in Pennsylvania